The men's qualification for football tournament at the 1973 All-Africa Games.

Qualification

Zone I (North Africa)
Algeria qualified by default. Libya, Morocco and Tunisia withdrew.

Zone II (West Africa 1)
The tournament was held in Dakar, Senegal. The tournament was also the second edition of the Tournoi de la Zone II.

Guinea qualified.

Zone III (West Africa 2)
The tournament was held in Ghana.

Ghana qualified.

Zone IV (West Africa 3)
The tournament was held in an away/home format. Togo withdrew.

 Match played at Lomé, Niger declined to host due to security fears.

Upper Volta qualified. Nigeria qualified automatically as host.

Zone V (Central Africa)
The tournament was held in Congo. It was also a football tournament, a part of the 1972 Central African Cup, an omnisport event.
Chad's matches were not counted in the football ranking because it did not enter the other sports. Zaire withdrew the games.

Congo qualified.

Zone VI (East Africa)
The tournament was held in Cairo, Egypt from 24 November to 1 December 1972. Ethiopia and Sudan withdrew.

Egypt qualified.

Zone VII (Southern Africa)
The tournament was held in Dar El Salam, Tanzania. The teams Botswana, Burundi, Madagascar, Malawi, Swaziland and Zambia withdrew.

Tanzania qualified.

Qualified teams
The following countries have qualified for the final tournament:

External links
African Games 1973 - Rec.Sport.Soccer Statistics Foundation''

1965